Mariana Duque was the defending champion, but decided not to participate.

Annika Beck won the title, defeating Anastasija Sevastova in the final, 6–3, 6–1.

Seeds

Draw

Finals

Top half

Bottom half

References 
 Main draw

Reinert Open - Singles
Reinert Open